János Vörös (25 March 1891 – 23 July 1968) was a Hungarian military officer and politician, who served as Minister of Defence in the unofficial Interim National Government which led by Béla Miklós. He fought in the First World War at the Eastern Front and the Italian Campaign. He was appointed as Chief of Army Staff on 19 March 1944, when the Nazis occupied Hungary. Later Vörös joined the Red Army which arrived at Hungary's eastern border.

He was the signer of the Moscow armistice convention as one of the members of the Interim Government delegation. In 1946 he was retired by them at his own request. During his 58th birthday (1949) he was arrested with the charge of spying by the military investigation service. The Military Court sentenced Vörös to life imprisonment him in 1950. He left prison in 1956, and died in 1968 in Balatonfüred.

References
 Magyar Életrajzi Lexikon

1891 births
1968 deaths
People from Veszprém County
Hungarian soldiers
Austro-Hungarian military personnel of World War I
Austro-Hungarian Army officers
Hungarian military personnel of World War II
Defence ministers of Hungary
Hungarian prisoners sentenced to life imprisonment
Prisoners sentenced to life imprisonment by Hungary
Hungarian politicians convicted of crimes